The Dolphin Show is a non-profit student theatre organization that annually presents a large-scale student-produced musical theatre production at Northwestern University.

History 
A group of Northwestern University men formed the Dolphin Club in 1939 to compete in  Chicago area swimming meets. In 1940, the 15-member team held  a swim carnival to raise money to attend a meet in Florida. The carnival and the meet were both successful, so the water show was repeated in 1941 and 1942. When World War II forced the cancellation of the annual Waa-Mu Show, the club combined their tradition with some students from Waa-Mu to present an evening of song and dance called the Dolphin Show. The 1944 Dolphin Show was a musical revue called "Wela Kahau" including women's water ballet and the men's Dolphin Club. Proceeds from this show bought war bonds. In 1948 audiences returned to see a musical-comedy revue around the original Patten Gymnasium pool. 
The Dolphin Show became jointly produced by the female Lorelei swimming club in 1949, but drifted away from its aquatic origin. The Dolphin Executive Board gave equal representation to both clubs who chose a theme for each year's show. In 1963 the production was no longer raising funds for the swim clubs. In 1964 the show presented Gilbert and Sullivan's The Mikado around the pool. 
In 1970, the group performed the musical Mame on stage at Cahn Auditorium.

Alumni include actors David Schwimmer, Warren Beatty, Richard Kind, lyricist Sheldon Harnick, musical director Keith Dworkin, singer Ardis Krainik and Kate Shindle who was Miss America 1998.

Shows 
The productions have been awarded Northwestern University's Center for Student Involvement's "Outstanding Theatrical Production", "Outstanding Producers", and "Outstanding Director" awards, as well as William Daniels Awards, including "Best Musical."

References

Northwestern University
Musical theatre companies
1939 establishments in Illinois